Selen may refer to the following people:

Given name
Selen Altunkulak (born 1997), Turkish-French women's footballer
Selen Öndeş (born 1988), Turkish female volleyball player
Selen Soyder (born 1986), Turkish actress, activist, model and beauty pageant titleholder

Surname
Bert Selen (born 1985), Dutch music producer, TV/Film composer, multi-instrumentalist and songwriter
İsmail Selen (1931–1991), Turkish general 

Turkish-language surnames
Turkish given names